The J. T. Abbot House is a historic house at 34 Essex Street in Andover, Massachusetts.  The Gothic Revival house was built in the late 1840s for Joseph Thompson Abbot by Jacob Chickering, a leading local real estate developer and builder of the mid 19th century.  The ornamental detailing is among the most elaborate of the time in the town.  The house was listed on the National Register of Historic Places in 1982.

Description and history
The Abbot House is set on the south side of Essex Street, a through street lined by a mix of commercial and residential buildings, not far from the center of Andover, Massachusetts.  The house is a -story wood-frame structure, with a steeply-pitched front gable roof and two side-facing cross gables on its main block, and another two on an addition that extends to the rear.  The side-facing gables of the main block, along with its main gable, are ornamented with jigsawn bargeboard trim.  The main gable has a short lancet-arched window at the attic level.  The front facade is two bays wide, with a projecting polygonal bay window in the left bay and the front door in the right bay, sheltered by a portico.  Both the portico and bay window are topped by scroll-sawn decorative woodwork.

The land on which the house stands was purchased by Jacob Chickering, one of Andover's leading mid-19th century developers, in 1844.  Chickering sold the lot, with the house on it, in 1850 to Joseph Thompson Abbot.  In 1878 Chickering was contracted to construct a picket fence for the property.  The house has had a number of owners, and may have been rented by the local Baptist church as a parsonage for a time.  It presently houses a law office.

See also
National Register of Historic Places listings in Andover, Massachusetts
National Register of Historic Places listings in Essex County, Massachusetts

References

Houses completed in 1844
Houses in Andover, Massachusetts
National Register of Historic Places in Andover, Massachusetts
Houses on the National Register of Historic Places in Essex County, Massachusetts
Gothic Revival architecture in Massachusetts